Osel  or Ösel may refer to:

People 
 Tenzin Ösel Hita (born 1985), Spanish Tibetan Buddhist tulku
 Ösel Tendzin (1943–1990), American Tibetan Buddhist lama

Other uses 
 Ösel (yoga)
 Orchestre Symphonique des Étudiants de Louvain-la-Neuve, a Belgian symphony orchestra
 Saaremaa, an island of Estonia, known as  Ösel in German and Swedish
 Kreis Ösel, a subdivision of the Governorate of Livonia of the Russian Empire